Patrick Delaney (born 1997) is an Irish hurler who plays for Offaly Championship club Kinnitty and at inter-county level with the Offaly senior hurling team. He usually lines out as a corner-back.

Career

Born in Kinnitty, County Offaly, Delaney first came to hurling prominence at juvenile and underage levels with the Kinnitty club before eventually progressing onto the club's senior team. He first appeared on the inter-county scene during a two-year stint with the Offaly minor team before a three-year tenure with the under-21 side. Delaney made his first appearance with the Offaly senior hurling team during the 2017 National League. He secured his first silverware during the 2021 season, when Offaly claimed the National League Division 2A and Christy Ring Cup titles.

Honours

Offaly
Christy Ring Cup: 2021 
National Hurling League Division 2A: 2021

References

External links
 Paddy Delaney appearance record

1997 births
Living people
Irish engineers
Kinnitty hurlers
Offaly inter-county hurlers